In mathematics, a diversity is a generalization of the concept of metric space.  The concept was introduced in 2012 by Bryant and Tupper, 
who call diversities "a form of multi-way metric".  The concept finds application in nonlinear analysis.

A diversity is a pair  consisting of a set  and a function  satisfying 
 (D1)  , with  if and only if ; and
 (D2) if  then .

Bryant and Tupper observe that these axioms imply monotonicity; that is, if , then .  They state that the term "diversity" comes from the appearance of a special case of their definition in work on phylogenetic and ecological diversities.  They give the following examples:

Diameter diversity

Let  be a metric space.  Setting   for all  defines a diversity.

diversity

For all finite  if we define  then  is a diversity.

Phylogenetic diversity

If T is a phylogenetic tree with taxon set X. For each finite , define
 as the length of the smallest subtree of T connecting taxa in A.  Then  is a (phylogenetic) diversity.

Steiner diversity

Let  be a metric space.  For each finite , let  denote
the minimum length of a Steiner tree within X connecting elements in A.  Then  is a
diversity.

Truncated diversity

Let  be a diversity.  For all  define
.  Then if ,   is a diversity.

Clique diversity

References

Metric spaces